Group B of UEFA Euro 2020 took place from 12 to 21 June 2021 in Copenhagen's Parken Stadium and Saint Petersburg's Krestovsky Stadium. The group contained host nation Denmark, Finland, Belgium and host nation Russia. The head-to-head match between the hosts took place at Denmark's Parken Stadium.

Teams

Notes

Standings

In the round of 16,
The winner of Group B, Belgium, advanced to play the third-placed team of Group F, Portugal.
The runner-up of Group B, Denmark, advanced to play the runner-up of Group A, Wales.

Matches

Denmark vs Finland
In the 43rd minute, the match was suspended after Danish midfielder Christian Eriksen collapsed on the pitch due to a cardiac arrest. Eriksen was transferred to Rigshospitalet where he was stabilised. UEFA gave the players two options for restarting the match, either to resume later in the evening or the next day at 12:00 CEST. Only after receiving confirmation that Eriksen was awake, the Danish team agreed to continue the match that evening. The match was resumed at 20:30, with the last four minutes of the first half to be completed prior to a five-minute half-time break.

Belgium vs Russia

Finland vs Russia

Denmark vs Belgium

Russia vs Denmark

Finland vs Belgium

Discipline
Fair play points were to be used as a tiebreaker if the head-to-head and overall records of teams were tied (and if a penalty shoot-out was not applicable as a tiebreaker). These were calculated based on yellow and red cards received in all group matches as follows:
yellow card = 1 point
red card as a result of two yellow cards = 3 points
direct red card = 3 points
yellow card followed by direct red card = 4 points

Only one of the above deductions would be applied to a player in a single match.

References

External links

Group B overview at UEFA.com

UEFA Euro 2020
Denmark at UEFA Euro 2020
Finland at UEFA Euro 2020
Belgium at UEFA Euro 2020
Russia at UEFA Euro 2020